Christopher Tvrdy (born 20 February 1991) is an Austrian footballer who plays for FC Sollenau.

See also
 Football in Austria

References

External links
Christopher Tvrdy's football stats

Austrian footballers
Austrian Football Bundesliga players
1991 births
Living people
SC Wiener Neustadt players

Association football midfielders